Ferenc Schnetzer (26 October 1867 – 3 April 1944) was a Hungarian military officer and politician, who served as Minister of Defence in 1919, during the Romanian occupation of Hungary. He took part in the Friedrich's coup against cabinet of Gyula Peidl.

References

 Magyar Életrajzi Lexikon

1867 births
1944 deaths
People from Baja, Hungary
Hungarian people of German descent
Hungarian people of the Hungarian–Romanian War
Hungarian soldiers
Defence ministers of Hungary